Union Jack is a ballet made by New York City Ballet co-founder and founding choreographer George Balanchine to traditional British tunes, hornpipe melodies and music-hall songs, ca. 1890–1914, adapted by Hershy Kay. The premiere took place on 13 May 1976, at the New York State Theater, Lincoln Center, to honor British heritage in the United States its bicentennial with costumes by Rouben Ter-Arutunian, original lighting by Ronald Bates and current lighting by Mark Stanley. At the finale the ensemble spells out "God Save the Queen" in semaphore code and the Union Jack unfurls. Principal dancer Jock Soto included an excerpt from Union Jack in his farewell performance in June 2005.

Music 

The music includes Scottish military tattoos and folk-dance forms; a music-hall pas de deux for the costermonger Pearly King and Queen; hornpipes, sea songs, work chants and jigs.

selections 
  
"Keel Row"
"Caledonian Hunt's Delight"
 
"Regimental Drum Variations"
"Amazing Grace"
 
"A Hundred Pipers"
"The Sunshine of Your Smile"
the Scottish theme from Händel's Water Music

Costermonger pas de deux 
  
"Dance wi' My Daddy"
 
"The Night the Floor Fell In"
"Our Lodger's Such a Nice Young Man"
 
"Following in Father's Footsteps"
"A Tavern in the Town"

finale 
"Rule Britannia!"

Original cast
Sara Leland
Kay Mazzo
Karin von Aroldingen
Suzanne Farrell
Patricia McBride
Helgi Tomasson
Jacques d'Amboise
Peter Martins
Jean-Pierre Bonnefoux
Victor Castelli
Bart Cook

References 
Playbill, New York City Ballet, Friday, 27 June 2008

Articles 

NY Times by Anna Kisselgoff, 13 May 1976
Sunday NY Times by Clive Barnes, 23 May 1976
NY Times by Gia Kourlas, 25 December 2005
NY Times by Tobi Tobias, 12 February 2006

Reviews 
NY Times by Clive Barnes, 14 May 1976
NY Times by Jennifer Dunning, 10 January 1980
NY Times by Jack Anderson, 21 June 2005
NY Times by Alastair Macaulay, 30 June 2008

External links 
Union Jack on the Balanchine Trust website

Ballets by George Balanchine
New York City Ballet repertory
1976 ballet premieres
Ballets by Hershy Kay
Ballets designed by Rouben Ter-Arutunian
Ballets designed by Ronald Bates